Caldwell, North Carolina can refer to:

Caldwell, Mecklenburg County, North Carolina, an unincorporated community
Caldwell, Orange County, North Carolina, an unincorporated community